Brainless Killers is an indie short film released in October 2015 and directed by Ren Thackham.  On its release at the 2015 Sydney Indie Film Festival it won awards for Best Film, Best Thriller and Best Special Effects in the short film category.

Cast
Mayor of Zombridge - Steve Hughes
Aaron - Ben Hamilton
Andrew - Benjamin Scott
The Hunter - Danny Bolt
Zederick - Ian Mathers
Zedra - Kirsty McKenzie

Awards and nominations

References

External links
 

2015 films
Australian comedy short films
2010s English-language films
2010s Australian films